The 2017 American Athletic Conference women's soccer tournament was the postseason women's soccer tournament for the American Athletic Conference held from November 1 to 5, 2017. The five-match tournament took place at UCF Soccer and Track Stadium, home field of the regular season champion UCF Knights in Orlando, Florida. The six-team single-elimination tournament consisted of three rounds based on seeding from regular season conference play. The Connecticut Huskies were the defending tournament champions, but they were eliminated from the 2017 tournament with a 3–1 first round loss to the Memphis Tigers. South Florida won the tournament by virtue of winning the penalty shoot-out tiebreaking procedure following a tie with UCF in the final. The conference tournament title was the first for the South Florida women's soccer program and for their head coach, Denise Schilte-Brown.

Bracket

Schedule

First Round

Semifinals

Final

Statistics

Goalscorers 

 1 Goal
 Vivien Beil – Connecticut
 Morgan Ferrara – UCF
 Stasia Mallin – UCF
 Mikayla Morton – Memphis
 Stefanie Sanders – UCF
 Allie Thornton – SMU
 Evelyne Viens – South Florida
 Elizabeth Woerner – Memphis

See also 
 2017 American Athletic Conference Men's Soccer Tournament

References 

 
American Athletic Conference Women's Soccer Tournament